Ronald Gray (20 January 1868 – 16 November 1951) was a British painter. His work was part of the painting event in the art competition at the 1932 Summer Olympics.

References

1868 births
1951 deaths
20th-century British painters
British male painters
Olympic competitors in art competitions
People from London
19th-century British male artists
20th-century British male artists